Gazi Fazlur Rahman is a Awami League politician and the former Member of Parliament of Dhaka-22.

Career
Rahman was elected to parliament from Dhaka-22 as an Awami League candidate in 1973.

Death
Rahman was killed on 17 March 1974 in Narsingdi. He was the first Member of Parliament from Awami League to be killed after the Independence of Bangladesh.

References

Awami League politicians
1974 deaths
1st Jatiya Sangsad members
Assassinated Bangladeshi politicians
1974 murders in Bangladesh